"Fino all'estasi" is a song by Italian singer-songwriter Eros Ramazzotti featuring American recording artist Nicole Scherzinger, released on November 13, 2012 as the second single from the album Noi. A Spanish-language version of the single, titled "Hasta el éxtasis", was also released to launch the Hispanic edition of the album, Somos. The song was written by Ramazzotti, Luca Chiaravalli, Anthony Preston, Carlo Rizoli, Mila Ortiz Martin and Saverio Grandi.

Background and release
On July 21, it was announced that Eros Ramazzotti had left Sony Music and signed a recording contract with Universal Music Group. A few days later, Ramazzotti's manager Giancarlo Giannini, announced that he had planned to start working on new material between September and October 2011, in order to release a new album in November 2012. However, in January 2012, Ramazzotti split with his manager, replacing him with Michele Torpedine. In August 2012, it was announced that the new album would be released on 13 November 2012, while the album title was revealed on September 4, 2012.

Of the song, Ramazzotti commented: "Nicole and I must have met in a previous life. I truly enjoy working with her, it's a great experience. I've recorded many duets in my career : Tina Turner, Cher, and now Nicole. I'd say my voice matches really well with the Inglese language singing of these talented singers."

Music video
"Fino all'estasi" is a black & white, classic and elegant video with a high visual impact and a bit of irony, clearly showing how Eros and Scherzinger had fun on the during a shooting break. The video was filmed and directed in Milan, Italy by Robert Hales with the artistic direction of Luca Tommassini. The music video premiered on VEVO on June 12, 2013.

Track listing
"Fino all'estasi" – digital download
 "Fino all'estasi" – 3:45
 "Hasta el éxtasis" - 3:45

Charts  and certifications

Weekly charts

Certifications

Release history

References

2012 songs
2013 singles
Eros Ramazzotti songs
Nicole Scherzinger songs
Songs written by Eros Ramazzotti
Songs written by Anthony Preston (record producer)
Music videos directed by Robert Hales
Macaronic songs
Spanglish songs